WEYY is a Christian radio station licensed to Tallapoosa, Georgia, broadcasting on 88.7 MHz FM.

External links
Gospel Radio Network's website

EYY